A Movie (Film By Kelly Chen) is the fourth Cantonese studio album by Hong Kong singer Kelly Chen. It was released on December 20, 1997, through Go East Entertainment Company Ltd/ Polygram Recaords in Hong Kong.  The album incorporates pop with elements of alternative, ragga and sentimental ballad. Chen wanted to shift from traditional HK-pop to alternative.

Track listing

CD 

Kelly Chen albums
1997 albums